Tréouergat is a commune in the Finistère department of Brittany in north-western France.

Population

Breton language
The municipality launched a linguistic plan through Ya d'ar brezhoneg on 23 September 2005.

See also
Communes of the Finistère department

References

Mayors of Finistère Association 

Communes of Finistère